Iowa Highway 76 (Iowa 76) is a state highway located in northeastern Iowa, most of which is in Allamakee County.  The  highway connects McGregor to Eitzen, Minnesota via Waukon.  It begins in McGregor at an intersection with U.S. Highway 18; the first  of the route are signed as U.S. Highway 18 Business (US 18 Bus.).  It crosses into Minnesota near Eitzen and continues as Trunk Highway 76.

Route description
Iowa Highway 76 begins as U.S. Highway 18 Business at U.S. Highway 18 west of McGregor.  The route descends into the Mississippi River valley along the northern border of Pikes Peak State Park and then turns into McGregor.  Through McGregor, US 18 Bus. heads to the northeast towards the Mississippi River.  Along the river, the highway is parallel to the Dakota, Minnesota and Eastern Railroad (DM&E Railroad).  For one mile (1.6 km), US 18 Bus. travels a narrow strip of land between the river and the bluffs where it passes the Isle of Capri casino.

At Marquette, US 18 Bus. ends at the foot of the Marquette–Joliet Bridge, which carries US 18 to Prairie du Chien, Wisconsin.  At US 18, Iowa 76 appears for the first time and continues to the north.  Between Marquette and the mouth of the Yellow River, Iowa 76 runs parallel to the DM&E Railroad along the western bank of the Mississippi River.  It turns inland near Effigy Mounds National Monument, turning to the northwest towards Waukon.  It passes near the Yellow River State Forest and through the unincorporated community of Rossville.

South of Waukon, Iowa 76 intersects Iowa 9.  Eastbound Iowa 9 and northbound Iowa 76 head north together for two miles (3.2 km).  At Main Street, the two highways split; Iowa 9 continues north while Iowa 76 heads west for a few blocks before turning north itself.  From the western edge of Waukon, it travels north into the rolling hills of the Driftless Area, an area of the Midwestern United States which was untouched by glaciation in the last ice age.  The highway descends into the Upper Iowa River valley where it crosses the Upper Iowa and its tributaries, Bear Creek and Waterloo Creek.  Iowa 76 follows Waterloo Creek for  until they near the unincorporated community of Dorchester.  From Dorchester, the highway curves to the east and north, traveling  to the Minnesota state line south of Eitzen.

History
Iowa Highway 76 was created in 1969 from a segment of Iowa Highway 13 from Marquette to Minnesota.

In 1989, Iowa 76 was extended  to the south when a new bypass around McGregor was opened.  US 18 was moved onto the bypass and the old road became Iowa 76, but was marked as U.S. Highway 18 Business.  The only proof of Iowa 76 along US 18 Bus. are small Iowa 76 route markers above the mile markers.

Major intersections

References

External links

End of Iowa 76 and Business US 18 (Clayton Co.) at Iowa Highway Ends

Transportation in Clayton County, Iowa
076
Transportation in Allamakee County, Iowa
U.S. Route 18
076